Peter P. Bevacqua is an American corporate, media, and sports executive. He is the chairman of NBC Sports, a role he was promoted to in September 2020. Bevacqua previously served as the President of  NBC Sports  since 2018. Before joining NBC Sports, Bevacqua spent six years as the Chief Executive Officer of the PGA of America.

Personal life
Bevacqua grew up in Bedford, New York. He began playing golf at a young age with his father, Arthur Bevacqua, a dentist. He attended Brunswick School in nearby Greenwich, Connecticut where he was valedictorian, senior class president and an all-league player in football, basketball and golf. He began caddying at the Bedford Golf and Tennis Club at age 10, training under head pro Walt Ronan, and continued to work summers there as a caddie and pro shop manager while attending the University of Notre Dame.  He was also a walk-on punter for head football coach Lou Holtz at Notre Dame, where he graduated magna cum laude with a bachelor's degree in English in 1993. He then earned a Juris Doctor from Georgetown University, graduating cum laude in 1997.

Bevacqua and his wife, Tiffany, have one daughter and two sons.

Professional career
Bevacqua began his professional career as a legal associate at Davis Polk and Wardwell LLP in New York City before joining the United States Golf Association (USGA) in 2001. He first served as the USGA's in-house counsel for two years. He was then promoted to USGA's first-ever managing director of the U.S. Open. In 2009, Bevacqua was appointed as the USGA's chief business officer. Bevacqua left USGA for CAA Sports three years later, in 2012, where he served as Global Head of Golf. He was appointed as the CEO of the PGA in fall 2012. He subsequently signed to two contract extensions, one in November 2013 and another in November 2017, which was due to carry him through 2024.

In October 2013, Bevacqua successfully negotiated a 15-year media rights extension through 2030 with NBC Sports for the Ryder Cup, Senior PGA Championship and PGA Professional Championship. In 2014, the PGA designed and implemented a long-term strategic plan that focused on two main goals: to better serve PGA members and to increase public interest in golf. Alan Shipnuck of Golf.com described Bevacqua's vision as, "... growing the game to create more opportunities for PGA pros, embracing new technology to make the membership more relevant, and improving communication with the national headquarters to make the pros feel more valued". Bevacqua was appointed as the World Golf Foundation Board of Directors' Chairman in 2015. In that role he helped the International Golf Federation reinstate golf in the Olympics, beginning with the 2016 Olympic Games in Rio de Janeiro. In August 2017, Bevacqua announced that,  beginning in 2019, the PGA Championship would be conducted annually in May for the first time in 70 years.

Comcast NBCUniversal promoted Bevacqua to chairman, NBC Sports in September 2020. He is NBC Sports' third chairman. He oversees NBC Sports’ collection of assets and platforms including NBC Sports, NBC Olympics, Golf Channel, NBC Sports Regional Networks, NBC Sports Radio, NBC Sports Digital, and two transactional sports businesses, GolfNow and SportsEngine.

Together with his team, Bevacqua completed numerous key rights agreements. In August 2022, NBCUniversal and the Big Ten Conference reached a 7-year agreement for NBC and Peacock to become the exclusive home of Big Ten Saturday Night football, beginning in 2023. The new agreement also includes eight additional Big Ten Football games each season, exclusively on Peacock, as well as dozens of men’s and women’s basketball games, Olympic sports, golf and more. In March 2021, NBCUniversal and the NFL agreed to an 11-year extension and expansion for NBC Sports to continue as the home of Sunday Night Football, primetime television’s No. 1 show for an unprecedented 11 consecutive years. The deal also includes live coverage of every game by Peacock and Telemundo Deportes for the first time. In addition, NBCUniversal re-acquired the complete U.S. media rights for all United States Golf Association championships, including the U.S. Open and U.S. Women’s Open, through 2026; agreed to a nine-year extension of the company’s PGA TOUR rights; secured a new Sunday night NFL Wild Card playoff game, which was presented live across NBC, Telemundo, and Peacock in January 2021; agreed to a six-year extension with Premier League through 2028, and established NBCUniversal’s multi-year partnership with PointsBet, making PointsBet the official sports betting partner of NBC Sports. Bevacqua oversaw NBC Sports' historic coverage of the 2020 Tokyo Summer Olympics and 2022 Beijing Winter  Olympics. 

A former SportsBusiness Journal “Forty Under 40” Award recipient in 2009, Bevacqua was honored with the prestigious “Sports Leadership Award” by the March of Dimes in November 2016.  

He is a board member of RISE, an alliance of sports organizations that promotes racial equality. Bevacqua is also on the board of directors of Brunswick School in Greenwich, CT  

Bevacqua is a Member of the Board of Visitors with the Georgetown University Law Center.

References

American sports executives and administrators
Living people
Year of birth missing (living people)
Davis Polk & Wardwell lawyers
University of Notre Dame alumni
Georgetown University Law Center alumni
People from Bedford, New York